Symphyotrichum spathulatum (formerly Aster spathulatus) is a species of flowering plant in the family Asteraceae native to western North America including northwestern Mexico. Its flowers, which open in July and August, have violet ray florets and yellow disk florets.

Description
Symphyotrichum spathulatum blooms in July and August and is a colony-forming perennial that grows typically 1–5 hairless or mostly hairless stems from a long rhizome. The leaves are linear or elliptical, narrow, and sometimes obovate at the base of the plant.

The flower heads grow in corymbiform to paniculiform arrays with little branching. These surround the flower centers composed of 30–80 (sometimes up to 100) yellow disk florets.

Chromosomes
Symphyotrichum spathulatum has a base number of x = 8. Diploid, tetraploid, hexaploid, and octaploid cytotypes with respective chromosome counts of 16, 32, 48, and 64 have been reported, depending upon the infraspecies, as follows:

 S. spathulatum var. spathulatum: 2n = 2x = 16, 2n = 4x = 32, 2n = 6x = 48, and 2n = 8x = 64
 S. spathulatum var. intermedium: 2n = 4x = 32, 2n = 6x = 48, and 2n = 8x = 64
 S. spathulatum var. yosemitanum: 2n = 2x = 16, 2n = 4x = 32

Taxonomy
Symphyotrichum spathulatum is one of the species within Symphyotrichum sect. Occidentales. S. spathulatum was first formally described by John Lindley in 1834 as Aster spathulatus.

Three varieties of Symphyotrichum spathulatum are recognized, including the autonym:
 S. spathulatum var. spathulatum
 S. spathulatum var. intermedium
 S. spathulatum var. yosemitanum 

S. spathulatum is one of the parents of the two allopolyploidal Symphyotrichum species S. ascendens and S. defoliatum.

Distribution and habitat
Symphyotrichum spathulatum is found in the western United States, western Canada, and northwestern Mexico. It is native to British Columbia and Alberta in Canada, and in the United States from Washington state east to Montana, south to New Mexico, west to California, and north again to Oregon. There is no recorded presence in Arizona. In Mexico, it is native to the states bordering the Gulf of California.

S. spathulatum var. intermedium is native to British Columbia, California, Idaho, Nevada, Oregon, and Washington state, only occasionally being found in California and Nevada.

S. spathulatum var. yosemitanum is restricted from southern Oregon to the Sierra Nevada of California.

Conservation
, NatureServe listed Symphyotrichum spathulatum as Secure (G5) worldwide and Possibly Extirpated (SX) in Alberta. S. spathulatum var. intermedium and S. spathulatum var. spathulatum were reported as Secure Varieties (T5), and no status rank was given for S. spathulatum var. yosemitanum.

Notes

Citations

References

spathulatum
Flora of Western Canada
Flora of the United States
Flora of Mexico
Flora of the Sierra Nevada (United States)
~
~
Plants described in 1834
Taxa named by John Lindley